Oryahovo Heights (Oryahovski Vazvisheniya \o-'rya-hov-ski v&-zvi-'she-ni-ya\) are the ice-covered heights of elevation 340 m extending 6 km in north-south direction in central and eastern Ioannes Paulus II Peninsula, Livingston Island in the South Shetland Islands, Antarctica.  They are linked to Snow Peak to the southeast by two saddles separated by the small ice dome of Casanovas Peak described by Àlex Simón i Casanovas from the Spanish Antarctic Programme in the 2000/01 austral summer. The heights were visited by a field party from the British base camp Station P during the summer season 1957/58. 

They are named after the town of Oryahovo in northwestern Bulgaria.

Location

Maps
 L.L. Ivanov et al. Antarctica: Livingston Island and Greenwich Island, South Shetland Islands. Scale 1:100000 topographic map. Sofia: Antarctic Place-names Commission of Bulgaria, 2005.
 L.L. Ivanov. Antarctica: Livingston Island and Greenwich, Robert, Snow and Smith Islands. Scale 1:120000 topographic map.  Troyan: Manfred Wörner Foundation, 2009.  
 Antarctic Digital Database (ADD). Scale 1:250000 topographic map of Antarctica. Scientific Committee on Antarctic Research (SCAR). Since 1993, regularly upgraded and updated.
 L.L. Ivanov. Antarctica: Livingston Island and Smith Island. Scale 1:100000 topographic map. Manfred Wörner Foundation, 2017.

Notes

References
 Oryahovo Heights. SCAR Composite Antarctic Gazetteer
 Bulgarian Antarctic Gazetteer. Antarctic Place-names Commission. (details in Bulgarian, basic data in English)

External links
Oryahovo Heights. Copernix satellite image

Landforms of Livingston Island